ASRC may refer to:

 Arctic Slope Regional Corporation, a U.S. federal contractor with business in the aerospace, defense, and other sectors
 Asylum Seeker Resource Centre, a support organisation for asylum seekers in Melbourne, Australia
 Australian and New Zealand Standard Research Classification